Colin Kenneth Beashel (born 21 November 1959) is an Australian sailor who crewed on the winning America's Cup team Australia II in 1983 and competed at six Olympics between 1984 and 2004, winning bronze in 1996. He became, jointly with Brazilian Torben Grael, the eighth sailor to compete at six Olympics. He helmed Australia Challenge at the 1992 Louis Vuitton Cup.

Born in Sydney, Beashel comes from a sailing family. His father Ken is a local sailing legend. His brother Adam was a sailor for Team New Zealand in the Americas Cup in 2003, 2007 and 2013. Adam's wife Lanee Butler sailed at four Olympics.

Beashel competed at the Olympics in the two-person keelboat, with Richard Coxon in 1984, Gregory Torpy in 1988, and David Giles from 1992 to 2004.  He and Giles also won the World Championships in 1998 in the Star class. He now runs the family boat shop in Elvina Bay, Pittwater.

See also
 List of athletes with the most appearances at Olympic Games

References

External links
 
 
 
 

1959 births
Living people
Australian male sailors (sport)
Olympic sailors of Australia
Olympic bronze medalists for Australia
Olympic medalists in sailing
Sailors at the 1984 Summer Olympics – Star
Sailors at the 1988 Summer Olympics – Star
Sailors at the 1992 Summer Olympics – Star
Sailors at the 1996 Summer Olympics – Star
Sailors at the 2000 Summer Olympics – Star
Sailors at the 2004 Summer Olympics – Star
Medalists at the 1996 Summer Olympics
Star class world champions
Sailors from Sydney
1987 America's Cup sailors
1983 America's Cup sailors
1992 America's Cup sailors
World champions in sailing for Australia
Etchells class world champions